Charles Higham may refer to:
Charles Higham (archaeologist) (born 1939), British archaeologist, specialising in the archaeology of Southeast Asia
Charles Higham (biographer) (1931–2012), biographer and poet
Sir Charles Higham (publicist) (1886–1938), British publicist, author and member of parliament